Arthur Young (1853 – 22 December 1924), was an English architect, particularly of Catholic churches.

Career
He was born in 1853 at Stamford, Lincolnshire, the second son of Charles Edward Young, and was educated there at Stamford Grammar School,  and then studied for two years at the "Technische Schule" at St Gall in Switzerland. He was then articled to Philip Causton Lockwood, Borough Surveyor of Brighton from 1870-3, before working in the offices of E. J. Tarver; followed by the noted church architect Benjamin Ferrey; and then George Sommers Clarke between 1870 and 1879. He commenced work in London in 1877. He was working from 19 Queen Anne's Gate in Westminster in 1886 and from 5 South Square, Gray's Inn in 1914. He became a FRIBA in 1886.

Notable buildings
 Our Lady and St Thomas of Canterbury, Harrow (1894)
 St Mary Magdalene, Bexhill-on-Sea (1907)
 Our Lady and St. Augustine, Rickmansworth (1909)
 St Edmund's parish chapel, Old Hall 
 Dominican convent at Watford 
 Convent of Our Lady of Sion
 Catholic High School, at Bayswater 
 New wing at Ratcliffe College 
 St Edward's, Golders Green 
 Church of St Edmund of Canterbury and English Martyrs, Ware (1911)
 Benson Memorial Church, Buntingford (1914) 
 Our Lady's, Chesham Bois
 St Dominic's, Harrow

References

Literature
Brodie A. (ed),(2001), Directory of British Architects, 1834–1914: 2 Vols,  British Architectural Library, Royal Institute of British Architects.

1853 births
1924 deaths
Architects from Lincolnshire
People from Stamford, Lincolnshire